Australian rules football in the United States (most commonly referred to simply as "Footy" but sometimes "Aussie Rules" or AFL) is a team and spectator sport which has grown rapidly since the late 1990s.

It was originally introduced to the United States of America (USA) in 1906 and by 1910 "field ball" or "fieldball", as Australian rules football was called, in San Francisco Bay area schools, filled a niche that was later occupied by soccer. By 1911 with the rapid expansion to schools and colleges in three major cities the US overtook New Zealand to become the second largest Australian football playing nation in the world and there were three reciprocal tours with international matches played at junior level between 1909 and 1919. However availability of officials, large fields, squads of sufficient size and difficulty in differentiating the sport from rugby as well as a lack of support from the game's administrators in Australia stunted its growth and it went into permanent recess at the end of the 1920s. The sport was rekindled in the 1980s through interest generated mainly from television highlights from Australia. Prior to this, it has been confused with rugby football which is less popular than American football in the US. The world governing body, the AFL Commission has made efforts to differentiate it from rugby, producing educational videos such as "What is AFL?" aimed at a North American audience.

The current national club competition and governing body, the United States Australian Football League (USAFL) traces its origins back to 1996. Today there are numerous leagues around the country. The USAFL National Championships is the largest club tournament in the world. The national men's team - the USA Revolution - debuted in 1999, its best result is bronze the 2005 Australian Football International Cup and has won the 49th Parallel Cup 10 out of 11 times. The national women's team, the USA Freedom - debuted in 2007 and reached bronze in the 2011 Australian Football International Cup. A national youth team has also been established and participation is growing in women's teams, junior teams and in modified and non-contact variations such as Metro Footy and Footy 7s.

AFL clubs began taking interest in converting American athletes, particularly college basketballers into professional Australian rules footballers from 2010 through the AFL International Combine. While many moved to Australia to further their careers, only two have made the grade: Jason Holmes and Mason Cox, with the latter's success in the AFL contributing to a boom in American interest in the sport since 2016.

History

Australian rules football was virtually unheard of in the United States in the 19th Century. American Football (gridiron), Association Football (soccer) and Rugby Football were all established sports and Americans had limited awareness of the Australian game. Even Gaelic football had been introduced to the United States by 1892.

Australian footballer Pat O'Dea moved to America in 1898 to visit his brother in Wisconsin and quickly became a legendary gridiron punter. O'Dea made headlines as the "Kangaroo Kicker" in the late 1890s. Yet rarely any received any mention of developing his kicking prowess through the Australian game, let alone his previous career in Australia with the Melbourne Football Club.

A 1905 VFL Report made mention of a request from parties including president Theodore Roosevelt in the US in obtaining copies of the Laws of the Game. The enquiry was due to a spike in deaths and injuries in American Football, and inquiries into ways to make its football games safer. In response, the VFL enthusiastically wrote to 69 American universities and colleges insisting that they adopt the VFL's laws and affiliate with the newly formed Australasian Football Council (AFC) which it led. According to De Moore (2021) this overconfidence of the VFL in the superiority of its league competition backfired spectacularly in that it inadvertently led to the introduction of intercollegiate rugby into the United States, a 1912 Australia rugby union tour of Canada and the U.S. and the establishment of Rugby union in the United States, effectively denying Australian Football the opportunity to become established. Furthermore, American Footballers did not adopt any of the VFL's laws, however their investigations eventually led to legalising the forward pass to open up the field of play a distinctive feature of the game today.

Following the VFL's failed attempt to convert the colleges, and its underestimation of the pull of global rugby, the league resolved not to respond to any further requests for copies of the game's laws. It successfully lobbied the AFC not to support the game being played outside Australasia, much to the frustration of proponents such as West Australian Football League secretary John J Simons.

Simons, while organising a promotional Australian Football tour of England, had sought to include the US and wrote to various football groups including expatriate Australians in North America to express interest in fielding teams against the Australians. He initially wrote to Con Hickey, chairman of the VFL for assistance, proposing the league send a touring side and provide funding, however Hickey replied that the VFL would not support the initiative believing it would be a failure. While the tour never went ahead, Simons was instrumental in the formation of teams in Vancouver and several Australians in America also answered the call.

First introduction: 1906–1909 
In 1906 Pat O'Dea along with his older brother and kicking mentor Andrew (of the Wisconsin University Athletic Club and its American Football coach) were able to attain a copy of the Victorian Football Association's rules (as this league was not affiliated with the AFC) and had begun training college students at the University of Wisconsin–Madison. Another expatriate Victorian cricketer A Warne, working with the Philadelphia City Council introduced the game in Pennsylvania along with cricket. But it was ex-Fremantle WAFL player Charles Lynan, then working at the Southern Pacific Transportation Company in San Francisco who had the most success training students, most of whom were basketballers and rugby players, at Columbia Park Grammar School. The VFL in 1908 through Hickey had begun to promote universal football as a preferred alternative to Australian rules for North Americans to play and compete against Australia, anticipating the league to adopt the rectangular field over the traditional oval field. Lynan seeing the trend away from American Football as a major opportunity, and in response to a burgeoning local rugby community initially sought to convince the newly formed San Francisco Barbarians Rugby Club and also Stanford's newly formed rugby team, who had been actively seeking less violent alternatives to American Football, to try Australian Football. Though he garnered their support, including a financial commitment, the fanfare of the Australian rugby team's tour and matches against the two clubs in 1909 saw them lose interest in the venture. Following the tour, "Australian football" had to Americans, become synonymous with rugby.

Lynan decided that teaching younger players would be more effective to differentiate the sport and engaged O'Dea (following his move to San Francisco to practice law) to assist him to popularise it. By January 1909, they had trained more than 450 junior athletes to choose the best to form a squad. Having gained the support of the Public Schools Athletic Association of San Francisco president and founder of the Columbia Park Boys' Club Major Sidney Piexotto, Lynan and O'Dea, in correspondence with Australian football organisations including the WAFL and Young Australia League (YAFL) (who earlier had donated two footballs to the school) organised a cross-cultural excursion, feeling that their American boys were ready to take on Australia.

Simons once again applied to the VFL to provide a week's board, to which the league telegraphed that it was "totally opposed to the scheme" and refused any support. Undeterred, Simons as chairman of both the WAFL and YAFL, arranged for these leagues to fully fund the American's travel and board, providing £3,000 for an exchange visit. A management committee was formed consisting of: Lynan, B. Free, L. Resleur, R. Buchanan, William McCann and T. Wood with a coaching panel consisting of Pat O'Dea, Lynan, Buchanan and Price. The 40 selected schoolboys, most of them also baseballers set sail on the SS Mariposa on May 21, 1909.

First schoolboys tour of Australia: 1909 

The initial tour was ambitious, and intended to visit many nations of the Commonwealth including all Australian states and play football matches, however in addition to the WAFL and YAFL reply invitations were received only from the New South Wales Football Association in Sydney and VFA in Melbourne, Victoria. The football side consisted of: Henry Behre (captain); Edward Burke (vice captain); James Caveney; Frank B. Cliff; John Costello; Charles Day; Frank Danis; Edward Firestone; Harris Fraser; Michael Glaser; E. Griswold; Robert Hayes; Emil Hastings; Garnet Holme; A. Johnson; Benjamin Katz; James Kerrigan; Harvey Loy; G. Locke; C. Meinhart; H. Meanwell; Adolph Muheim; Charles Nagel;  Edward Nelson; Charles Norton; Roy O'Connell; Alfred Peterson; William Prang; Hyman Raphael; Sidney Rosenthal; Edward Ryan; IA. Schmoll; A. Schmulowitz; Theo Steffens; E.Stern; Frank Trachsler; A. Truhler; Lee Waymire; P. Webber; Claude Weinhart; George Wihr; Edward Wilson; Sheridan Williams; George White; and, Leon Wing.

From a football perspective, the tour was an outstanding success. The team won an impressive 25 of the total 38 matches scheduled. The young side learned quickly and returned very keen to introduce the game to the States. Following the tour, NSWAFL patron and Sydney Football Club president Sydney lawyer R.A Munro King sponsored a competition to send an Australian schoolboy to America to help teach Americans Australian rules. The winner, decided based on the student who could give the best lecture on the game, its history and development was a Sydney (Fort Street Public School) schoolboy and surf lifesaving champion Eric Cullen-Ward who received a £200 travelling scholarship for his lecture and returned with the team to San Francisco.

New Zealand
En route via Tahiti, the Americans visited New Zealand, both north island at Wellington on May 12 where they were asked why they did not play rugby, but trained with local footballers at the Basin Reserve. An invitation to visit and play against the Auckland Australian Football League was left unfulfilled. The Americans also visited the south island including Invercargill though no football matches were organised by the local leagues.

New South Wales
The Americans arrived in Sydney in July and played against Sydney Public Schools on the 7 July. Their first match was against Sydney combined schools which had won the most recent Australian schoolboys championship. The Sydney tour did not have the desired promotional effect in Sydney with the rugby dominated media, unaware of Australian rules being played in the United States, mistakenly describing them as a touring American football, or rugby team.

Victoria

En route to Melbourne the Americans were scheduled to visit towns along the way including Goulburn, Wangaratta, Victoria, Benalla and Beechworth to play against local representative sides. They arrived in Melbourne in late July. The tour however was much to the dissatisfaction of the Australasian Football Council's Con Hickey who was refusing to endorse it and warned the Americans not to attempt to engage with the VFA either. The AFC had insisted that touring footballers stay in Melbourne and affiliate with the AFC and the Victorian Football League. When the visitors arrived in Melbourne the AFC offered a VFL contribution of £70 to the tour, along with a £130 contribution from the South Australian Football League however the AFC revoked this stating the tour was not returning the profits it had expected. Hickey had offered to pay for the return fare to San Francisco, but only if they committed to cancelling their West Australian tour. The young players being amateurs, most of them had paid their own way, declined out of respect for the Western Australian hosts. As a result, they weren't able to play against any AFC affiliated league clubs but were able to play against the country clubs and schools.

The Americans shocked Melbourne with an embarrassing win in front of a sizeable crowd, in which the visitors kept them goal-less. Instead of playing football, the VFL organised for the Americans to watch a VFL match at South Melbourne between South Melbourne and Fitzroy, this was criticised after the match was marred by melees and the sort of heavy on-field violence that the Americans schools sought to avoid. The VFL's football boycott of the American tour was highly criticised by the West Australian media, accusing the Victorians of being sore losers and putting profits before the promotion of the game.

Western Australia
The troupe arrived in Fremantle on the TSS Kanowna for the West Australian leg of the tour. The generous interest and media coverage in Western Australia was a stark contrast to the cold receptions received by the Americans in Sydney and Melbourne. In West Australia, they visited areas where Australian rules was very strong including Perth, Fremantle and the Goldfields in September 1909 where they honed their skills against local sides in some and were spectators of West Australian Football League matches. John Simons, WAFA secretary acted as dedicated tour manager. By the time had left Perth, the game hardened outfit were faced with regional teams. The young Americans notched together an impressive strings of successive wins, losing only to the large towns and cities. The skill level, physicality and pace of the Americans shocked many local sides, with several local sides demanding rematches and rally preparing a stronger side, in such cases however the local media would typically only report details when the local side won though a full record of the tour was kept by the organisers.

South Australia

The Americans arrived in Port Adelaide on the Kyarra in October 1909 for the start of their South Australian tour. With the South Australian Football Association aligning with the VFL and the AFC, beyond a lukewarm reception upon the visitors initial arrival, interest and media coverage in Adelaide was virtually nonexistent. Despite this, the Americans won the majority of their matches against the South Australians.

The tourists finally reached Brisbane and Queensland on January 19, 1910, for a rushed, low key visit and were, by that time, too exhausted from the oppressive outback heat to play any further football matches in Australia. The also visited Tasmania before returning to San Francisco on the SS Makura on January 17, 1910.

"Field Ball" takes off in American schools: 1910–1914 

The return of Columbia Park boys and the arrival of Cullen-Ward from Sydney who travelled along with them (along with YMCA instructor C.F Martin) helped the game, first known locally as "bouncing football" and "field ball", spread to San Francisco public grammar schools in early-mid 1910. It was one of four football codes to be played including American, Association and Rugby football however the parents at these 35 Californian schools had decided not to permit their children to play either American or Rugby football and Pexiotto was keen to see Australian rules adopted spruiking its key benefits as being safer and more appealing to spectators. Cullen Ward conducted several clinics, including one at Mission High School, Everett Grammar School and Crocker Grammar School. The first game, played at Golden Gate Park, between squads of up to 25 players consisting mostly of rugby players under Australian Rules was promoted among local schools, with many of the local schools invited to watch. After seeing the Australian "Field Ball" (as it was then promoted), an excited Fremont Boys from Riverside expressed interest in starting a team to join a new competition in May, but Pacific Heights Grammar School was the second and regular matches were played between the two schools. Lowell Grammar School and Crocker Grammar later joined the competition with a substantial number of rugby players making the switch. Hancock Grammar school joined in with regular practice against Crocker Grammar.

Reference to Australia in the name was disfavoured and grammar schools had decided to call it "Field Ball" in an effort to distance it from rugby and give it more local appeal and the name stuck. Cullen Ward was to go on to teach, coach, play and officiate field ball at several dozen schools across the San Francisco Bay Area, Los Angeles, San Diego, Seattle, Vancouver in June 1911 and went on to coach an All-American team against visiting sides. He married an American in 1912 and intended to settle permanently in California.

Field Ball, now being promoted as "the ideal game for grammar school students" was played by Hancock against Crocker schools in front of a crowd of around 4,000 students A call went out to expatriate Australians familiar with the "Victorian Rules" to help organise senior matches being played under the banner of the Barbarians (Rugby Club). The Hancock side was coached by a teacher of Stockton Grammar School who had been taught by Cullen and also introduced the game there. Roosevelt Grammar School adopted the code later in the year along with Franklin Grammar School.

Chicago and Philadelphia schools were also adopting the code and in 1911 calls were made for Australian coaches to facilitate representative sides. Representatives from the University of California met to formalise governing body for a San Francisco v Chicago representative match, to introduce Field Ball into colleges and to send a team to tour Australia. The new body secured a dedicated training and match facility and head office at Ocean Shore grounds. An editorial in the San Francisco Call noted that local school children much preferred Field ball over the American sports and it had become highly popular despite their parents preferring that they play American national sports like American Football, Baseball and Basketball.  In San Francisco, the league expanded to include Everett Grammar School, Monroe Grammar School and YMCA Oakland (where Australian C.F Martin had been appointed physical director).

Young Australia League tour of North America: 1910–1911 

Plans for a Young Australia League reciprocal tour of the US to play against an American side began as early as April 1910, Simons originally proposed that the team be represented by players from all states of Australia, but without support from the Eastern States the proposed interstate quota was dropped to 10. As it became obvious that AFC affiliated states were not coming to the party, a contingency plan was set in place for it to be Western Australia only, consisting of a balance of half city and half country players. In the end an agreement was reached with the governing bodies of the eastern states that the final team would feature 40 West Australians, one South Australian and one Victorian and the touring party was to detour to Adelaide and Melbourne prior to departure at the tour manager's expense to receive the two interstate players.

Three matches with the Young Australian League were set for September at the Presidio of San Francisco Cullen-Ward was appointed head coach of the national team. The Australian team arrived on the Matai. They were received with much fanfare with a full page photo of the Australian team featuring in the papers, along with the local boys captained by Henry Behre. The Australian team guernsey was a variation of the West Australian Black Swan emblem acknowledging the West Australian contribution to the tour but featuring a map of Australia to also acknowledge the national nature of the side, while the American team wore the colours and monogram of the Columbia Park Athletic Club. The match was won 95 to 44 at Lincoln Park in front of a crowd of 5,000 including most of the school children in the city and photos of gameplay were featured in The San Francisco Call. In the second match, the Americans took it up to the Australians with the match decided by just 8 points Australia 9.16 (70) to San Francisco 8.14 (62). The match also stimulated interest in the Australian expatriate community, and a third match was played between a combined residents side and the visitors which the visitors won convincingly 125 to 30. The showcase attracted the attention of The New York Times which featured it in an article "Australian Game of Football is the Best".

Senior competition established: 1911–1913 
Following the success of the Young Australia League tour, four clubs were formed to give maturing students and expatriate men an opportunity to play open age football in a championship competition including a proposed expatriate Australian club with two teams. The game was also played on Stanford University campus with the aim of establishing a club there. On the 5th December, 1911, the Public Schools Athletic League endorsed Field Ball as an official school sport, establishing an all-schools tournament.

By August 1911, the game was proving so popular that there weren't enough officials to support its growth. Cullen Ward  and the Columbia Park Club had departed for Vancouver in Canada where schools had also been taking up the sport in recent years. En route to Vancouver the party visited Portland, Oregon and played an exhibition match at the University of Oregon. The touring party helped ready Canadian players from Fort Vancouver High School to compete against a touring Young Australian League. This tour was highly successful and plans were begun for a second tour of Australia in 1914, with a request made to the Australasian Football Council for a senior Australian team to tour the USA.

The popular schools competition in 1913 had grown to 150 boys with new teams including Laguna Honda; State Normal; Washington; Bay View; and James Lick. Many of the original juniors  had grown and a colleges team was planning to represent the US in Australian Rules team to tour Australia to play matches against Australian high school teams starting in Perth, Western Australia from June, 1914 however this was later brought forward.

Australia withdraws support & second schoolboys tour: 1913–1914 
In 1913, the Americans once again toured with a new group, and had planned a series of around 40 matches, however with funding for only 12 in the touring party, there was not enough of them to field a full team of 22. This time they visited Western Australia, South Australia, Victoria and Tasmania. The Young Australia League once again hosted the American side, however the WAFL, facing backlash from the AFC, began to distance itself from the venture and withdrew financial commitment to the tour. Though media interest for the tour was scant, they did play matches against local sides, including one in Broken Hill, and at Norwood Oval in Adelaide. In November, 1913, they arrived in Melbourne on the Loongana. When asked of how the game in America was faring, the group cited the biggest challenges to its survival being access to fields and funding.

The YAL and Columbia Club began to organise a third tour for 1915 with plans for reciprocal tours every 3 years.

In response to the American's 1912 request, a proposal was debated in 1914 by the Australasian Football Council to send a team the US, however a decision was deferred until after the war. The council never approved the motion.

The Young Australia League, did send 32 boys to tour the US and Canada in 1915, playing football matches.

World War I and third schoolboys tour: 1914–1919 
Following news of his father's death Cullen Ward returned to Sydney via the US during the war. O'Dea disappeared completely from the public eye in 1917.

In 1915 Harry Bromley visited America in 1915 to promote the idea of a "national football" code, a hybrid version of Australian football played on American gridiron fields which allowed throwing of the ball. He wished to capitalise on the growing popularity of Gaelic football, Australian football and American football in the States and gained the support of Irish American Athletic Club member James Sullivan to help promote it. However America's entry to the war put an end to the plans.

A third schoolboys tour to Australia was organised in 1919 following the war and managed by E.D Grace, with many of the original team members now of high school age. However except when in Western Australia, Australian Football was now rarely part of the visitors programme. In Western Australia, however they defeated a team from the new Northam Senior High School by 3 points, also played a match at Beverley who won by one point and one in Katanning.

Recess and revival attempts: 1920–1947 
Commentators in Australia however noted that by the 1920s the sport in America was in dire trouble with soccer now being adopted by most of the junior schools, it had better access to fields and required less players to hold a match. These were the last reports of the sport both in schools and at senior level.

In 1926 the Australian Football Council's Con Hickey received a letter inviting Australian teams to play test matches against visiting Kerry county football team (Gaelic Football) in California, noting Gaelic Football's growing popularity in the US since the war.

With growth of American football in the colleges causing rugby popularity to wane, attempting to establish Australian Football in high schools and colleges seemed like a better option. Hopes were pinned on Carji Greeves (1924 Brownlow Medal winner) arrival to California to resurrect it. Greeves was appointed kicking coach at UCLA in 1928. He would study at Stanford University, where he delivered on his promise to coach students there in Australian Rules. However it continued to be confused with rugby and as such did not set down firm roots in the colleges.

Speaking in 1929 on the status of the sport in America, the Australian Football Council's Con Hickey mused that efforts to establish it there had failed  but cited Gaelic Football's rapid growth in the US in the 1920s as an example of how Australian Football might one day carve a niche, though reiterated that the council had no interest in promoting it and was sufficiently pleased so long as its popularity continued to grow in Australia.

In 1932, a tour by two Australian teams was proposed supported by former VFL players living in the US including Carji Greeves. The idea was boosted when a touring Young American League in Melbourne commented that it would be ideal for high schools and proposed that the VFL invest in promoting the game. Melbourne Councillor Beaurepaire visiting the USA also urged the Australian Football Council to consider sending teams to America to play either Australian rules or the increasingly popular Gaelic code. Former Port Adelaide footballer Gordon Inkster also got behind the idea. The VFL, however showed little interest, and the AFC lacked support for the idea and the game faded into obscurity.

In 1934, the Los Angeles Daily News published photos of Geelong and South Melbourne Football Club VFL players flying in a pack marking contest mistakenly labelling it a game of "soccer".

In 1938, a proposal was put to the Australian National Football Council to send teams to California for an exhibition match to stimulate grassroots interest in the game, however Victorian president Bob Rush refused to take the idea seriously citing access to suitable grounds and that he would not endorse funding the venture.

In 1939, the VFL signed on to the Californian Universities International Kicking Competition to be held at Stanford University. However the league caused significant embarrassment when it backed out of their contract blaming the Australian National Football Council for its withdrawal. The VFL had been required to send footballs to UCLA Berkely, but failed to. When the Americans invited the VFA to participate, the ANFC blocked the invitation. Seen as a major opportunity to promote the code in the US instead it left the colleges extremely unsatisfied with the Australian code.

In response to a gridiron exhibition match in Melbourne in 1943, Harry Dyke the president of the Richmond VFL Club proposed a scheme which would coach the Americans in Australian Rules.

In 1947, 40 years after the AFC promoted the hybrid code of Universal Football, Melbourne Sports Globe sports writer Ern Cowley invented the game of Austus, a compromise game between gridiron and Australian rules were played in Australia between servicemen of both countries in the Australian city of Geelong. The visiting Americans were reported to be excited by the Australian game. Despite a series of popular matches which attracted US media attention, and an award for its inventor, the hybrid code did not take off outside of the military.

Push into the colleges and proposed tour: 1948–1959 
A major shift in attitude from the governing body in Australia occurred under the West Australian presidency of Wally Stooke. In 1948 when Carl K. Dellmuth, Director of Athletics and Physical Education at Swarthmore College in Pennsylvania after seen the game in Melbourne requested assistance from the governing body to introduce the sport to colleges citing the spectator appeal, the transferrable skills and the low entry cost of equipment. He succeeded in starting teams in his college. and in gaining cooperation from the Australian Football Council which responded by sending footballs, rule books and a wealth of promotional items. NSW association and AFC secretary K. G. Ferguson extolled that with the introduction of the sport into the college system the United States would be capable of sending a national team to Australia within 5 years. The AFC debated sending a touring side for an exhibition match at its national conference in Adelaide. Once again, Western Australia was in support of the idea and had formalised plans to send teams and budgeted £40,000 for the initiative to send a squad of 50 players consisting of contributions from all states (though with the majority of non-Victorians from West and South Australia). For the first time in decades, South Australia also voted in favour, however they could not garner the support of the VFL and other states so opted not to. This was not helped by the media in Australia which argued that it was destined to fail and that the league was better of spending the money at home. As a result of the lack of support from Australia, the proposed Swarthmore College - Haverford College clash was first postponed to 1949, then never went ahead. Enthusiasm for the sport in American colleges soon waned.

In the 1950s, the AFC's focus would increasingly shift toward to the idea of touring teams playing Gaelic Football in New York instead, due partly to the growth of the Gaelic code there, but also due primarily to the available fields and reduced investment of sending a much smaller side. The idea of a USA tour was revived by council members in 1954 but with a reduction in the size of the playing lists to 14 to reduce costs. This idea eventually manifest into the Australian Football World Tour with a focus on capitalising on Gaelic Football's growth in the US.

First VFL exhibition matches and Australian football world tour: 1960–1978 
From the 1960s, having negotiated its first television broadcast rights the VFL and its clubs began to take an interest in the US as a means of further growing its audience (even a small television audience in the US could have been worth more than the league made out of the entire state of Victoria). Both Melbourne and Geelong had taken an interest in the American market and in 1963 the first VFL exhibition matches were played in major US cities to test its potential international audience. The matches were very low key and were not successful in terms of attention or publicity.

On October 27, Geelong also played an extra intraclub exhibition match at "Big Rec" Golden Gate Park.

In 1965, former Victorian Football League player Colin Ridgeway was recruited by the Dallas Cowboys and played a total of 3 games as a punter.  Although he was the first Australian to make such a transition he did not have much of an impact in the NFL.

The Australian Football World Tour visited New York on Sunday, 5 November 1967 with the Australian Galahs playing International Rules at Gaelic Park against the New York GAA at Gaelic Park, New York City. The Galahs lost the match 4-8 (20) to 0-5 (5), the visitors not managing a score after half time. There were many brawls during the match, with the Galahs coming off second best in all of them. Hassa Mann, sucker punched behind the play, had his jaw broken in three places. Playing coach Ron Barassi had his nose broken by a giant New York narcotics detective (Brendan Tumulty), who broke his own thumb in the process of hitting Barassi. An exhibition match of Australian Football was played in addition to Gaelic Football.

Television, ESPN and the AFL: 1979–1990 
Television was the biggest breakthrough for Australian football in the United States. In late 1979, the brand new ESPN cable network signed its first international TV contract with the Victorian Football League (in 1990, it became the Australian Football League). Coverage began with the 1980 season with matches airing on late Friday and Saturday nights, sometimes live but usually one or two week tape delayed to up to 2.5 million subscribers. At the time, reports indicated ESPN paid the VFL nearly $100,000 (the VFL's Australian TV rights deal at the time was just $600,000). The 1983 VFL Grand Final was the first time in history that the Grand Final was broadcast live into the US. Coverage continued on ESPN until 1986, when the sport was dropped. This exposure on ESPN is credited with creating a generation of fans in the United States (and providing the foundation for the formation of AFANA and the USAFL in 1996). The founding of AFANA led to the first organized fan group for the sport outside Australia and lobbying for television coverage was part of the efforts to grow the sport from the beginning. The core of the initial players for the USAFL included many who first saw the matches on ESPN a decade or more earlier.

In 1987 an ambitious $10 million proposal from Perth magnate Errol Marron was put forward for a VFL expansion club based partly in Los Angeles named the Los Angeles Crocodiles with profits from increased television rights to fund a local league. Stadiums in the proposal included the Los Angeles Memorial Coliseum. In October 1987 Ross Oakley announced that the VFL had rejected the bid.

Despite the rejected bid, the VFL showed a renewed interest in rekindling its US broadcast deal and scheduled more exhibition matches to grow the audience. The locations played at were largely the product of the available venues more than anything. VFL and club promoters hyped their predictions of the crowds of more than 20,000, sending star players Darren Millane and Damian Bourke to promote the games, however the final attendance and interest fell way short of expectations. It wasn't until the league rebranded as the national AFL in 1990 and featured capital city branded teams from the Australian East and West coast that the league attracted a respectable attendance and interest.

The first American born player in the AFL, Don Pyke (who moved to Western Australia in his youth) debuted for the West Coast Eagles in 1989 and later that year, the first African-American born player Sanford Wheeler debuted for the Sydney Swans. However, despite the investment into the market and the birth of the national AFL competition no US TV deal was forthcoming.

Punt into America: 1991–1995 
In 1995, Darren Bennett – former Melbourne Football Club player was recruited by the San Diego Chargers. He went on to become one of the most successful punters in the history of the NFL. His popularity as an ex-Australian also considerably increased the awareness of Australian Rules in the US, as excerpts of him kicking goals in the AFL were sometimes shown on American television. Since Bennett, other Australian rules players have followed, having a small effect of exposing the Australian game to Americans.

Against the flow, Essendon Football Club coach Kevin Sheedy enticed former Oakland Raiders National Football League player Dwayne Armstrong to switch codes to Australian rules. The experiment was largely unsuccessful, with Armstrong not debuting at senior level, but nevertheless created media interest in Australia about the possibility of American athletes playing the Australian game.

US local matches and National League: 1996–1998 
The first match between two local US clubs was played in 1996 between Cincinnati and Louisville.
In the first year the Mid American Australian Football League was formed.
Many of the local players had found out about the game in the 1980s on television and ESPN. Although the local game grew, ESPN no longer broadcast AFL matches, and in response the lobby group AFANA was formed.

In 1997, the first club national championships were held in Cincinnati. Nashville hosted the first Australian Grand Final Festival in the same year. The United States Australian Football League (USAFL) was formed in 1997 to govern the code in the country.

In the early years prior to affiliating with the AFL, the USAFL chose to brand the game as "Footy" to differentiate it from rugby and was the governing body promoted itself by the informal name "US Footy", this is what many players and the media also refer to it as.

Steady growth: 1999–2015 

A national team, the Revolution, formed in 1999 to compete in a European event, the Atlantic Alliance Cup before concentrating on events closer to home.  The USA turned to competing against nearby Canada in the 49th Parallel Cup and was for a time coached by AFL legend Paul Roos. This Cup is an annual and keenly contested international event which both countries use as a guide to their progress and as preparation for the International Cup, the world cup of Australian Football.

In the same year, a record crowd of 1,000 attended an MAAFL match between the Nashville Kangaroos and Chicago Swans at Nashville in Tennessee.

In 1999, the first US college Australian rules football clubs formed in North Carolina when the UNC-Chapel Hill club is organized in the spring semester and the NC State club is established the following fall.  These two clubs established a rivalry that lasted for over a decade.

In 2001, the first college Australian rules football club outside of North Carolina began at Vanderbilt University.  In the following years, several new clubs emerged in universities across the state, many of them affiliated with USAFL clubs.

The Revolution competed in the 2002 Australian Football International Cup with an All-American side and finished fifth out of eleven countries.

In 2002, the Australian Football League began to recognise the potential of the US as a pool of talent and began providing a small amount of international funding to the USAFL. An offshoot was the US Footy Kids junior program, with strong similarities to AFL Auskick. The Australian Defence Force formed a relationship with the USAFL for Australian personnel on US postings to help make up the 30% of Australians allowed for a USAFL roster.

In 2003, clear weather at a Nashville home game against the St Louis Blues and Kangaroos saw the match set a new league crowd record.

In 2004, Vanderbilt University hosted the first US College Invitational.  This tournament was held in Nashville and was attended by representatives of Arizona State University, Belmont University, Middle Tennessee State University, North Carolina State University, University of Missouri - Kansas City, University of North Carolina - Chapel Hill, and Vanderbilty University.  The Tar Heels of UNC were crowned the first collegiate National Champions.

In 2005, the Revolution  attended the 2005 International Cup finishing third out of ten countries. 

In 2005, the USAFL struck a deal with the ASTN television station for rights to the game, however although the station has filmed local matches, they have not been televised.

Also in that year, Ben Graham joined the New York Jets, bringing media exposure for the Australian sport. On a multimillion-dollar NFL contract, Graham joined with the local New York Magpies club in fundraising activities.

In January 2006, an AFL promotional pre-season match was played in Los Angeles at UCLA between the Kangaroos and league premiers the Sydney Swans, it attracted a crowd of 3,200.

Saverio Rocca debuted in the NFL in 2007 as a punter, bringing media exposure for the Australian game.

Kevin Sheedy and Stephen Silvagni visited in 2007 on a tour of North America as AFL ambassador, attending the USAFL Nationals.

In 2008, a second US College Invitational was hosted by Vanderbilt University.  St. John's University at Minnesota were premiers, with UNC-Chapel Hill as runner-up, and Vanderbilt University placing third.  These were the only three sides attending the tournament.

In 2014, the USAFL organized a collegiate tournament in Texas featuring only Texas colleges.  Teams representing Texas A&M, Texas Tech, University of Houston, and University of Texas-Austin took part in the event.  Texas A&M and Texas Tech both won two matches and drew the game between them.  Texas Tech had the better percentage on the day.

Mason Cox era: 2016–present 
In 2016 former Texan basketballer Mason Cox, known literally as the biggest in the game, made a spectacular AFL debut and in the Anzac Day match in front of 80,000 fans asserted dominance within the first 80 seconds of the match, taking his first mark and with it scoring the game's first goal with his first kick in the AFL. He instantly became America's most notable export in the game and captured the imagination of the Australian sporting public earning the nickname "Coxzilla" for his on field and off-field presence. The big American's impact on the Australian sport could not be understated, with visiting celebrities including president to be Joe Biden in 2016 and Tiger Woods in 2019 meeting with the home grown product and with ESPN increasing its coverage of the sport in response. Cox played in a losing AFL Grand Final in 2018. Cox has received more media attention in the United States than almost any other AFL player and has expressed a keen interest in promoting the game at the grassroots in the US, visiting the US to support his brother Nolan Cox who played for the Austin Crows in back to back USAFL National Championships.

Exposure for the sport grew with Cox's introduction to the sport with increasing media interest coming from American broadcasting celebrities. In particular Conan O'Brien in 2019 featured a segment featuring the Sydney Swans with Conan learning how to play the game on his popular show was viewed by millions. Former American Footballer Pat McAfee announced a new found passion for Australian rules during the COVID pandemic in 2020, interviewing Mason Cox on his popular channel and adopting Mason Cox's club Collingwood as a supporter.

In 2020 the AFL signed a broadcasting rights deal with ESPN via ESPN2 and ESPN3. The move was a big hit. In 2022 American streaming companies Amazon, Paramount+ and YouTube expressed interest in bidding for the US broadcasting rights for the AFL beyond 2024.

Players

Administration and governing body
The governing body for Australian Rules in the United States is the USAFL. The USAFL coordinates the national club competition, the USAFL Nationals and the national Revolution team selection, manages player registration and transfers and distributes funds to local clubs and competitions.

The USAFL Umpires Association (USAFLUA) represents the field of umpiring and the interpretation of the laws of the game.USAFL Umpires Association

National team
The national teams are the USA Revolution and USA Freedom.  Both are the sole national teams for Australian football in the United States and are administered by the United States Australian Football League.

Major tournaments
USAFL National Championships – Held 2nd weekend of October every year
49th Parallel Cup – Held each non-International Cup year, alternating between US & Canadian soil.
AFL International Cup – Held every 3 years, began 2002.

Domestic representative tournaments
USAFL National Championships
USAFL East vs West

Participation
There are currently 49 active clubs across the country, 32 of which participated in the USAFL Nationals in 2018.

In 2004, there were 855 senior players in 38 active clubs.
By 2006, the league had grown to 40 affiliated clubs, with 1,048 were registered USAFL players and 340 USAFL sanctioned matches were played. Of the 709 players who competed at the USAFL National Championships, 77.4% were non-Australian, and over 60% were American.

The 2007 AFL International Census did not indicate any growth to these figures over 2006.  The club numbers decreased to 32 in 2011, but player registrations remained at approximately 1,000.

Leagues

Men's
United States Australian Football League
Mid American Australian Football League (MAAFL)
Eastern Australian Football League
Golden Gate Australian Football League

Women's
Women's Australian Football Association

See also Metro Footy Leagues

Former leagues
Many of the CAFL's clubs and former players still compete, either in the SCAFL or GGAFL. The SEAFL and NEAFL formed the EAFL.
Californian Australian Football League
South East Australian Football League
North East Australian Football League

Audience

Television
Since 2020, the AFL has been shown on ESPN via ESPN2 and ESPN3.

Since 2006, due to growing demand and lobbying by AFANA, Australian rules began playing live matches on television in the United States on the new Setanta Sports USA network. Coverage in 2015 is on Fox Sports 2 and Fox Soccer Plus.

Australian rules has a nominal but growing international audience. According to Roy Morgan Polls 7,496,000 North Americans watch Australian rules football at least occasionally on television.  This number is twice as many as watch the sport on television in Australia, but small by US standards.

Notable attendances

Local competitions
1,000 (2004) – Nashville Kangaroos v Chicago Swans (Nashville, Tennessee)
5,000 (1911) – San Francisco v Young Australia League (Lincoln Park, San Francisco)

Exhibition matches
14,787 (1990) – Melbourne v West Coast (Civic Stadium, Portland)

See also
USAFL
AFANA

Books

References

Australian rules football in the United States